Sitaram Bagh Temple or Seetharambagh temple, built by Seth Puranmal Ganeriwala, member of the Ganeriwala family, is an old temple located in Mangalhat, a suburb of Hyderabad, Telangana,India. It is spread over 25 acres. Sitaram Bagh temple is classified as a heritage building by INTACH. The 7th Nizam of Hyderabad HEH Mir Osman Ali Khan made a huge donation towards re-construction of this temple.

References

External links
 A blog on Seetharambagh temple

Heritage structures in Hyderabad, India
Hindu temples in Hyderabad, India